Kevin Max Benavides (born 9 January 1989) is an Argentine rally raid motorcyclist who is best known for winning the Dakar Rally twice, in 2021 and 2023, as well as coming second place in 2018. He is a former driver of the Monster Energy Honda Racing. In April 2021, he signed to race for Red Bull KTM Factory Racing in both the FIM Cross-Country Rallies World Championship and the Dakar Rally onboard the KTM 450 RALLY.

Biography
He is the brother of Luciano, a rally raid biker too.

Benavides won the 2021 Dakar Rally in the bike category.

He recently signed with the KTM Factory Red Bull team, starting on 7 April 2021.

Dakar Rally results

Other results

FIM Cross-Country Rallies World Championship results

Rally raid best results (Motorbikes)

References

External links
 Biker profile at Dakar.com

1989 births
Living people
Dakar Rally motorcyclists
Argentine motorcycle racers
Off-road motorcycle racers
Dakar Rally winning drivers